The Tarahumaran languages is a branch of the Uto-Aztecan language family that comprises the Tarahumara and Huarijio languages of Northern Mexico. The branch has been considered to be part of the Taracahitic languages, but this group is no longer considered a valid genetic unit.

References

Southern Uto-Aztecan languages